Milford may refer to:

Place names

Canada 
 Milford (Annapolis), Nova Scotia
 Milford (Halifax), Nova Scotia
 Milford, Ontario

England 
 Milford, Derbyshire
 Milford, Devon, a place in Devon
 Milford on Sea, Hampshire
 Milford, Shropshire, a place in Shropshire
 Milford, Staffordshire
 Milford, Surrey 
 served by Milford railway station
 Milford, Wiltshire

Ireland 
 Milford, County Cork
 Milford, County Donegal

New Zealand 
 Milford Sound
 Milford Track
 Milford, New Zealand, a suburb of Auckland

Northern Ireland 
 Milford, County Armagh

Wales 
 Milford, Powys, a location
 Milford Haven, Pembrokeshire

United States 
 Milford, California
 Milford, Connecticut
 Milford station (Connecticut), commuter rail station
 Milford, Delaware
 Milford Hundred, an unincorporated subdivision of Kent County, Delaware
 Milford, Georgia
 Milford, Illinois
 Milford, Decatur County, Indiana
 Milford, Kosciusko County, Indiana
 Milford, Iowa
 Milford, Kansas
 Milford, Kentucky
 Milford, Maine, a New England town
 Milford (CDP), Maine, the main village in the town
 Milford, Massachusetts, a New England town
 Milford (CDP), Massachusetts, the urban part of the town
 Milford, Michigan
 Milford, Missouri
 Milford, Nebraska
 Milford, New Hampshire, a New England town
 Milford (CDP), New Hampshire, the central village in the town
 Milford, New Jersey
 Milford, New York, a town
 Milford (village), New York, within the town
 Milford (Camden, North Carolina), NRHP-listed historic site
 Milford, Ohio
 Milford, Pennsylvania
 Milford, Texas
 Milford, Utah
 Milford, Virginia
 Milford, Wisconsin, a town
 Milford (community), Wisconsin, an unincorporated community

People
 Milford (name), list of people and fictional characters

Publications 
 Milford Cabinet, weekly newspaper in Milford, New Hampshire
 Milford Magazine, bi-monthly publication in Milford, Pennsylvania
 The Milford Daily News, daily newspaper in Milford, Massachusetts

Ships
 Milford (ship), four commercial vessels
 HMS Milford, nine ships of the Royal Navy
 RMAS Milford (A91), a tender of the Royal Maritime Auxiliary Service
 SS Milford, later SS Salamanca, a Hong Kong cargo ship in service 1961-1967
 USNS Milford (T-AG-187), a cancelled Forward Depot Ship of the US Navy

Other uses 
 Milford (crater), on Mars
 Milford Writer's Workshop

See also 
 East Milford, Nova Scotia, Canada
 Milford Haven, Pembrokeshire, Wales
 Milford High School (disambiguation)
 Milford Lake, Kansas
 Milford Parkway (disambiguation)
 Milford Station, Nova Scotia, Canada
 Milford Township (disambiguation)
 New Milford (disambiguation)
 South Milford, North Yorkshire, England
 South Milford, Indiana
 West Milford, New Jersey